11 Aquilae (abbreviated 11 Aql) is a single star in the equatorial constellation of Aquila. 11 Aquilae is the Flamsteed designation. It has an apparent visual magnitude of 5.2, which means it is faintly visible to the naked eye. The brightness of this star is diminished by 0.33 in magnitude because of extinction from interstellar gas and dust.

This is an F-type main sequence star with a stellar classification of F8 V. It is radiating about 15.4 times the luminosity of the Sun from its outer atmosphere at an effective temperature of 6,118 K, giving it the yellow-white glow of an F-type star. 11 Aquilae has been listed as a candidate for membership in the Ursa Major Moving Group, but most likely does not belong to that association.

References

External links
 Image 11 Aquilae
 HR 7172
 CCDM 18591+1337

F-type main-sequence stars
Aquila (constellation)
Durchmusterung objects
Aquilae, 11
176303
093203
7172